Ahmed Muhammad Ali Obaid Al-Handasi is an Emirati writer, poet, historian and literary academic. He was born in Dibba, Sharjah in 1967. He studied Arabic literature at the United Arab Emirates University and graduated with a degree in Arabic in 1988. Then he joined Ain Shams University in Cairo, where he obtained a master's degree. He worked as a secondary school teacher, then as an assistant teacher at the UAE University. He has many poetry collections and literary works. He was distinguished for his research on pre-Islamic and pre-Islamic Arabic poetry.

Biography 
Ahmed Muhammad Ali Obaid Al-Hindasi was born in 1387 AH / 1967 AD in Dibba, in the Arab Emirate of Sharjah. He obtained a BA in Arabic Language and Literature from the UAE University in 1988, and after his master's thesis at Ain Shams University in Cairo. He worked as a teacher for two years from 1988 to 1990, then was appointed as an assistant teacher at the UAE University in 1990. He is a member of the Emirates Writers Union, the Culture and Science Symposium, and the World Islamic Literature Association. As a cultural planner, he worked on several cultural projects such as the National Project for Documenting the Emirates Dialects, the National Project for Documenting the Heritage of the Emirates, the National Project for Documenting Geographical Names, the Ahmed Obaid Cultural Initiative, and the Encyclopedia of Emirati Authors, Investigators and Translators.

Awards 
 October 26, 2010: Sharjah International Book Fair Award for the best Emirati book by an Emirati author for his book titled “Ka’ab Bin Ma’dan Al Ashqari.”
 2016: Sharjah Prize for Arabic Poetry, sixth session.

Writings

Poetry collections

Stories

Books

See also 

 Ali Al Reesh
 Awad Al Darmaki

References

External links

 Official Twitter account

Emirati writers
Historians
Arab writers
Emirati Muslims
1967 births
Living people